Peter Crossley-Holland (born 28 January 1916, London; died 27 April 2001, London) was a composer and ethnomusicologist. He wrote several books on the music of Tibetan Buddhism and composed music in ethnic styles including Celtic.

Early life and education 
Crossley-Holland attended Abbotsholme School. Although he was a keen pianist, he studied medicine not music at St John's College, Oxford, when he matriculated in 1933. However, his composition "Fantasy Quintet" for piano and strings enjoyed a professional performance in Sheffield by George Linstead. Further his "Violin Sonata" and "Suite No. 1 for strings", both composed in 1938, won him a composition scholarship at the Royal College of Music, where he was taught by John Ireland. He later he returned to Oxford for a B. Mus. degree. His graduating piece was in the celtic style, "A Song of Saint Columba." He later studied privately with Mátyás Seiber, Edmund Rubbra and Julius Harrison.

Career 
From 1948, he was a producer for the BBC Radio classical music station called the Third Programme, until he moved to Germany from 1964 to 1966 where he was Assistant Director of the Institute for Musical Research in Berlin. After teaching assignments in Illinois and Hawaii universities, he was appointed Professor of Music (Ethnomusicology) at UCLA in 1969. He retired in 1983 and moved to Wales.

Compositions
In 1983, Robert Stevenson of UCLA listed 92 performed compositions by Crossley-Holland in "Selected Reports in Ethnomusicology, Volume IV: Essays in Honour of Peter Crossley-Holland on his Sixty-Fifth Birthday":
 1933–1937 (14 works)
 1938–1943 (15)
 1943–1947 (16)
 1948–1960 (49)
After the publication of this Festschrift and his retirement from UCLA, he completed and performed an additional 16 works.

Symphony in D 
The symphony was composed over the period 1988 to 1994. It was recorded by the Royal Scottish National Orchestra, conducted by Martin Yates. Writing for AllMusic, James Leonard criticised it saying "...though well-composed and effectively orchestrated, lacks drive and cogency. Each movement rolls forward without going anywhere in particular..." Greenfield and Layton, writing in The Penguin Guide, were kinder, noting "...the ideas unfolding inevitably and organically. The idiom is distinctly diatonic but there is a real sense of purpose. He writes well for the orchestra and always holds the listener."

Personal life 
He married Joan Mary Cowper in 1939. They had two children, Kevin and Sally. He set some of his son's poems to music; his final work, the song "The Philosopher Bird" has words by his son Kevin and is dedicated to his daughter Sally. He and his wife were divorced in 1970. He subsequently married Dr. Nicole Crossley-Holland (née Marzac), a French medieval historian who has taught at Aberystwyth University since 1985. He died of a heart attack on 27 April 2001, age 85.

References 

1916 births
2001 deaths
Ethnomusicologists
20th-century English composers
People educated at Abbotsholme School
20th-century British musicologists
Musicians from London
English musicologists
Alumni of the Royal Academy of Music
University of California, Los Angeles faculty
20th-century English non-fiction writers
20th-century English male writers
20th-century British male musicians
English male non-fiction writers
BBC Radio 3
BBC radio producers